The Latin Grammy Award for Best Latin Children's Album is given every year since the 1st Latin Grammy Awards ceremony which took place at the Staples Center in Los Angeles, California. This category is restricted for recordings that are created and intended specifically for children. It is awarded to the artist with 51% or more playing time of the album, if no artist is credited with sufficient playing time, the award will go to the producer. The category includes Portuguese language recordings.

Brazilian singer and TV host Xuxa and Spanish clown and musician Emilio Aragón Bermúdez "Miliki" are the only artists who have received the award more than once, with two wins each. Xuxa is also the most nominated artist in the category with seven nominations.

Winners and nominees

2000s

2010s

2020s

References

External links
Official site of the Latin Grammy Awards

 
Latin Children's Album